Kshetresa Chandra Chattopadhyaya (1896–1974) was a distinguished scholar of Sanskrit from India. A scholar of Sanskrit, Veda, grammar, Pali, Prakrit and philology, he was born on 27 October 1896 in village Nimta of North 24 Parganas in what was then Bengal. He came from an illustrious family of Kulina Brahmans of Deshmukho in District Hooghly. The  Indian writer Bankim Chandra Chattopadhyay belonged to the same family and Kshetresa Chandra Chattopadhyaya inherited the spirit of Indian renaissance from him.

Education
Chattopadhyaya studied in a number of schools and passed the matriculation examination of the Calcutta University in 1913 from Hindu School of Calcutta. He then attended the Presidency College, Calcutta for Intermediate examination and passed in 1915. He then migrated to the United Province of Agra and Oudh and passed the B.A. examination of  Allahabad University (1917) and M.A. in Sanskrit from Queen’s College, Benares (1919). He also passed the M.A. Examination in Veda from Calcutta University in 1921 and Vedant in 1922. He in his college days became an intimate friend of Subhas Chandra Bose who later became a prominent figure in Indian politics and the Indian independence movement. Chattopadhyaya was a student of Dr. Ganganath Jha.

Career
Chattopadhyaya joined University of Allahabad as a lecturer in the department of Sanskrit in 1924. In the year 1950 he was promoted to reader and from 1956 for about a couple of years he acted as professor of Sanskrit. Later he became Director, Research Institute at Sampurnanand Sanskrit University, Benares. As the director, he was in a position to guide research exclusively.

Chattopadhyaya was the editor of book series Sarasvati Bhavana Granthamala and famous Sanskrit Journal, Sarasvati Susama. He was also appointed as a special scholar for comparative study of Veda and Avesta by the Ministry of Education, Govt. of India at Kendriya Sanskrit Vidyapeeth, Tirupati. The Calcutta University appointed him Stephan’s Nirmalendu Ghosh Lecturer on Comparative Religion in 1960 (In that period he was on leave from Sampurnanand Sanskrit University).

Disciples
He has produced many scholars, among them are
 B P T Vagish Shastri
 Vidya Niwas Mishra
 Govind Chandra Pande
 Govardhan Rai
 Kamlesh Dutt Tripathi

Work
Chattopadhyaya had been actively connected with All India Oriental Conference since its third session held in Madras in December, 1924. He presided over its Veda and Indo-Aryan section in the ninth session held at Trivandrum in 1937 and its Veda section in the eighteenth session held at Annamalainagar in 1955. He presided over the Philology section of Akhil Bhartiya Hindi Sahitya Sammelana held at Karachi in December 1946.

Honor
Certificate of Merit, President of India, 1966.

Book authored
 Eshakenopanishad (First Edition 1916), Reprinted in University Bi-Centenary Series, (Ed. B.N. Mishra), Vol VIII, Sampurnanand Sanskrit University, 1992.
 Vedavittaprakasika, 1966.
 Studies in Vedic and Indo-Iranian Religion and Literature, (Ed.Vidya Niwas Mishra), 1976.

References

Presidency University, Kolkata alumni
Writers from Kolkata
Sanskrit grammarians
University of Calcutta alumni
University of Allahabad alumni
Academic staff of the University of Calcutta
Vedic scholars
1896 births
1974 deaths
Sanskrit scholars from Bengal
Bengali Hindus
20th-century Indian linguists